PNS Shah Jahan (DDG-186) was a  in service with the Pakistan Navy since being recommissioned in 1994.

In 1998–2008, the extensive engineering modernization and midlife upgrade program by the KSEW Ltd. at the Naval Base Karachi reclassified her status as guided missile destroyer.

Service history

She was designed and constructed by the Yarrow Shipbuilders, Ltd. at Glasgow in Scotland, she was laid down on 30 October 1974, and was launched on 19 July 1978. During her service with the Royal Navy, she was notable for her wartime operations during the Falklands War with Argentina.

On 3 October 1994, she was purchased by Pakistan after the successful negotiation with the United Kingdom, along with PNS Tippu Sultan.

Upon arriving in Karachi, she underwent an extensive modernization and mid-life upgrade program by the KSEW Ltd. at the Naval Base Karachi in 1998–2002.

Her wartime performance included in deployments in patrolling off the Gulf of Aden, Gulf of Oman, Persian Gulf, Arabian Sea as well as deploying in the Mediterranean Sea when she was part of the multinational CTF-150.

On 12 January 2021, Shah Jahan was sunk as a target by the Pakistan Navy during a live-fire drill in the North Arabian Sea.

Gallery

References

External links
 
 

1972 ships
Tariq-class destroyers
Ships sunk as targets
Maritime incidents in 2021
Ships built in Southampton